Saint-Ciergues is a municipality in the French department of Haute-Marne (Grand Est region), and part of the arrondissement of Langres. It has 189 inhabitants (2017).

Geography
The area of Saint-Ciergues is 12.7 km², the population density is 15 inhabitants per km². The lowest level is 329 meters and the highest level is 457 meters
The map below shows the location of Saint-Ciergues with the main infrastructure and neighboring municipalities.

Demography

See also
Communes of the Haute-Marne department

References

Saintciergues